The Best Crowd We Ever Had is The Elders' first live album.

Track listing 

 "The Best Crowd We Ever Had" - 0:33
 "1849" - 4:44
 "Packy Go Home" - 5:31
 "Fire in the Hole" - 4:34
 "Moore Street Girls" - 3:51
 "Message from the Battle Zone" - 4:23
 "Saint Kevin" - 4:27
 "True Believer" - 4:08
 "Men of Erin" - 3:26
 "Galway Girl" - 4:22
 "It'll Be Alright" - 3:56
 "Buzz's Jig" - 4:17
 "Ten Pound Earhole" - 6:02
 "Turning Point" - 3:39
 "1849" - 3:54

The Elders (band) albums
2004 live albums